This is a list of printed books, manuscripts, letters, music scores, comic books, maps and other documents which have sold for more than US$1 million. The dates of composition of the books range from the 7th-century Quran leaf palimpsest and the early 8th century St Cuthbert Gospel, to a 21st-century holograph manuscript of J. K. Rowling's The Tales of Beedle the Bard. The earliest printed book in the list is a Southern Song annotated woodblock edition of the Book of Tang printed c. 1234. The first book to achieve a sale price of greater than $1 million was a copy of the Gutenberg Bible which sold for $2.4 million in 1978.

The book that has sold most copies over $1 million is John James Audubon's The Birds of America (1827–1838), which is represented by eight different copies in this list. Other books featured multiple times on the list are the First Folio of Shakespeare's plays with five separate copies, the Gutenberg Bible and The North American Indian with four separate copies each, three copies of De revolutionibus orbium coelestium, three separate broadside printings of the United States Declaration of Independence, two printings each of the Emancipation proclamation and the Thirteenth Amendment to the United States Constitution, two illustrated folios from the Shahnameh of Shah Tahmasp, two copies of the Philosophiæ Naturalis Principia Mathematica, Hortus Eystettensis, Geographia Cosmographia and William Caxton's English translation of Recuyell of the Historyes of Troye have also been repeatedly sold. Abraham Lincoln and Isaac Newton are the most featured authors, with three separate works, while Albert Einstein, Martin Waldseemüller, George Washington, André Breton, Robert Schumann, and Charlotte Brontë have two separate works each.

Table of book sales

Books and manuscripts by century

See also

 List of most expensive paintings
 List of most expensive sculptures
 List of most expensive photographs
 List of most expensive artworks by living artists

Footnotes

References
 Blair, Sheila, A compendium of chronicles: Rashid al-Din’s illustrated history of the world, Oxford University Press, 1995, 
 Oswald, Godfrey, Library world records, McFarland & Company, 2017 (3rd edition), 

Book collecting
Lists of books
Books
Manuscripts